Ilyas El Omari (born 1967 in Bni Bouayach) is a Moroccan politician. He head Tanger-Tetouan-Al Hoceima region, and headed the Akhir Saâ press group and was too General Secretary of Authenticity and Modernity Party.

References 

1967 births
Living people
People from Al Hoceima
Moroccan politicians
Authenticity and Modernity Party politicians
Riffian people